John Lawson (1709 – 1759) was an Irish academic.

Lawson was born in Magherafelt and educated at Trinity College Dublin. He became a Fellow of Trinity College in 1735, a lecturer in 1746 and Regius Professor of Divinity there in 1753.

References
	

18th-century Irish Anglican priests
Alumni of Trinity College Dublin
Academics of Trinity College Dublin
1709 births
1759 deaths
Regius Professors of Divinity (University of Dublin)
People from County Londonderry